The 2017 European Triathlon Championships was held in Kitzbühel, Austria from 16 June to 18 June 2017.

Medallists

Results

Men's 
Key
 # denotes the athlete's bib number for the event
 Swimming denotes the time it took the athlete to complete the swimming leg
 Cycling denotes the time it took the athlete to complete the cycling leg
 Running denotes the time it took the athlete to complete the running leg
 Difference denotes the time difference between the athlete and the event winner
 Lapped denotes that the athlete was lapped and removed from the course

Women's 
Key
 # denotes the athlete's bib number for the event
 Swimming denotes the time it took the athlete to complete the swimming leg
 Cycling denotes the time it took the athlete to complete the cycling leg
 Running denotes the time it took the athlete to complete the running leg
 Difference denotes the time difference between the athlete and the event winner
 Lapped denotes that the athlete was lapped and removed from the course

References

External links 
 Official page

European Triathlon Championships
Triathlon in Austria
2017 in Austrian sport
June 2017 sports events in Europe
International sports competitions hosted by Austria
Kitzbühel